Herbert James (1888–1958) was an English recipient of the Victoria Cross.

Herbert James may also refer to:

Herbert Armitage James (1844–1931), Welsh cleric and headmaster

See also

Bert James (disambiguation)